Elmakuzu is a village in Bozyazı district of Mersin Province, Turkey. It is situated in Toros Mountains to the north of Bozyazı. The village is far from the main roads. The population of the village was 138. as of 2012.

References

Villages in Bozyazı District